Morris Kaufman was appointed judge of the Court of Queen's Bench of Manitoba on October 7, 1998. He replaced the Honourable W.R. DeGraves, who had chosen to become a supernumerary judge.

Justice Kaufman graduated with a degree in law from the University of Manitoba in 1967, and was called to the Bar of Manitoba in 1968. Justice Kaufman first practised law with the firm of Yanofsky & Pollock, and then as a senior attorney with Legal Aid. From 1976 to 1978, he practised in partnership with K. Arenson, and from 1978 to 1987, was a sole practitioner in Winnipeg. He then founded and practised with the firm of Kaufman, Cassidy, Ramsay. He practised mainly civil litigation, aboriginal and criminal law.

References
 Government of Canada News Release (accessed August 3, 2007)

Judges in Manitoba
University of Manitoba alumni
Living people
Year of birth missing (living people)